Ednokukjevo is a village in the Bosilovo Municipality of North Macedonia.

Demographics
According to the 2002 census, the village had a total of 678 inhabitants. Ethnic groups in the village include:

Macedonians 557
Turks 107
Others 14

References

External links
Visit Macedonia

Villages in Bosilovo Municipality